Prescott Emerson (1840 – February 3, 1889) was a lawyer and political figure in Newfoundland. He represented Burgeo-LaPoile in the Newfoundland and Labrador House of Assembly from 1869 to 1878.

He was born in St. John's, the son of George Henry Emerson. Emerson was called to the bar in 1864. He supported union with Canada. Emerson served as speaker for the assembly from 1874 to 1878. In 1878, he retired from politics and was named chief clerk and registrar for the Supreme Court, serving until his death in 1889.

References 
 

Speakers of the Newfoundland and Labrador House of Assembly
1840 births
1889 deaths
Newfoundland Colony people